Pudong International Airport is a metro and maglev station located within Shanghai Pudong International Airport in Shanghai. It serves as both the eastern terminus of both the Shanghai maglev train, having opened to trial operations on 31 December 2002, and, since an eastern extension from  opened on 8 April 2010, the eastern terminus of Line 2 of the Shanghai Metro. Although the metro and maglev stations are in the same property, they have distinct fare-paid zones, as their fare systems are separate.

The currently under construction Airport Link line will include this station as an intermediate stop.

Station Layout

Gallery

References

Shanghai Metro stations in Pudong
Railway stations in China opened in 2002
Airport railway stations in China
Line 2, Shanghai Metro
Railway stations in Shanghai